Hunzenschwil railway station is a railway station in the municipality of Hunzenschwil, in the Swiss canton of Aargau. It is an intermediate stop on the standard gauge Zofingen–Wettingen line of Swiss Federal Railways.

Services
The following services stop at Hunzenschwil:

References

External links 

 

Railway stations in the canton of Aargau
Swiss Federal Railways stations